Christian Grahn (born Arne Christian Jääskeläinen; 12 June 1978), known professionally by his stage name Chris Dangerous, is the drummer of Swedish rock band, The Hives.

Biography
Grahn began playing drums at age of nine. Growing up in Fagersta, Västmanland, Sweden, he played drums in a local band, Bad Dreams Always, a hardcore punk band. Grahn's father was part of a Finnish cover band called The Sailors, which, according to Howlin' Pelle Almqvist, The Hives' frontman, was "The biggest guitar rock band in Finland at the time." Grahn's father also sang in a band called The Ventons. Grahn is of Finnish descent.

Musical style
Grahn is known for his high-speed drumming and accuracy when performing, switching beats easily in songs; "A Get Together to Tear it Apart" from Veni Vidi Vicious has an introduction by Grahn's drumming at a highly fast tempo. In The Hives' third album, Tyrannosaurus Hives, Grahn achieved a faster speed in his drumming, with rhythms and beats that are usually made by machines or synthesizers. The best example of this is the song "Two-Timing Touch and Broken Bones," where Grahn switches between his snare drum and mounted tom-tom with his left hand while playing eighth-notes on his hi-hat cymbals. Another example is the song "A Little More for Little You," in which Grahn plays almost three minutes of solid, unbroken sixteenth notes at a very fast tempo. Amongst other songs on the album, "Love In Plaster"  has one of the fastest tempos thus creating a faster drum beat. Grahn's drumming on the song is unbroken, and many fans joke of Chris Dangerous' "bionic arm".

Musical equipment
Grahn uses a four-piece drum setup - one rack (mounted) tom, one floor tom, a snare drum and a bass drum. All of his drums, hardware, and pedals are DW brand. He has his own special kit by DW drums called the Chris Dangerous Custom Groove Hip Kit. This custom kit, however, is not featured on the DW website. Grahn also uses Zildjian cymbals, Mainly the A  series. He uses an A series 21" Sweet Ride, an A 18" Thin Crash, and A Custom 14" Mastersound hi-hats.

Grahn sets up his drums to purposely make his kit look tiny - he lowers his cymbals, tom-toms, and snare drum, flattens the angle of his mounted tom (which is actually on a stand), and deliberately uses a smaller bass drum and floor tom to create the illusion of a very small kit. Arctic Monkeys drummer Matt Helders mimicked Dangerous' aesthetic style after watching him on television.

Discography

Barely Legal (1997)
Veni Vidi Vicious (2000)
Tyrannosaurus Hives (2004)
The Black and White Album (2007)
Lex Hives (2012)

References

External links
Official band website
Official MySpace
Starpuls Interview

Swedish drummers
Male drummers
The Hives members
1978 births
Living people
People from Fagersta Municipality
Swedish people of Finnish descent
21st-century drummers